University Health is the public hospital district for the San Antonio, Texas, US metropolitan area. Owned and operated by Bexar County, it is the third largest public health system in Texas. The system operates University Hospital, a 716-bed teaching hospital located in the South Texas Medical Center, and over 25 outpatient specialty and family medicine clinics throughout the San Antonio area.

History 
San Antonio's first public hospital, The Robert B. Green Memorial Hospital, opened in 1917 on the west side of what is now downtown San Antonio. The hospital suffered from inconsistent funding over the years, so in 1955, voters approved the creation of a hospital district and a property tax to provide a stable funding source for it. In 1959, the new hospital district was leveraged to promise a teaching hospital to attract the University of Texas South Texas Medical School, now the University of Texas Health Science Center at San Antonio. The hospital district broke ground in 1965 for the Bexar County Teaching Hospital, now University Hospital, adjacent to the site for the new medical school on a former hundred acre dairy farm located about 9 miles northwest of downtown San Antonio in what is now the heart of the South Texas Medical Center. Both the hospital and medical school opened in 1968.

In the 1970s and early 1980s, the hospital was the site of the Genene Jones murders, one of the largest serial killer cases in American history.

In 2014, the hospital was expanded to its current state with the completion of the Sky Tower, which contains the main entrance of the hospital.

As the primary teaching hospital for the University of Texas Health Science Center at San Antonio, University Hospital is a regional Level I Trauma Center and a leader in organ transplantation.

Expansion

New Women's & Children's Hospital

A new 300-bed Women's & Children's Hospital with private rooms is expected to open in August 2023. The project features a heart, vascular and endoscopy suite, new parking structure and an additional shell space for future growth.

The new hospital plans feature special amenities for mothers and babies and will be prepared to care for high-risk deliveries and complications during and after pregnancy. There will be a dedicated Obstetrics and Gynecology Emergency Department, Caesarian-section rooms, and a level IV neonatal intensive care unit connected to the labor and delivery unit.

The tower is also expected to be equipped to care for sick or injured children with a Children's Emergency Department, a pediatric rehabilitation gym and family friendly rooms.

See also

University of Texas Health Science Center at San Antonio
South Texas Medical Center

References

South Texas Medical Center
Teaching hospitals in Texas
University of Texas System
Hospitals established in 1917